The 2015 Cup of China was the third event of six in the 2015–16 ISU Grand Prix of Figure Skating, a senior-level international invitational competition series. It was held at the Capital Indoor Stadium in Beijing on November 6–8. Medals were awarded in the disciplines of men's singles, ladies' singles, pair skating, and ice dancing. Skaters earned points toward qualifying for the 2015–16 Grand Prix Final.

Entries

Changes to preliminary roster
 On August 17, 2015, Daniel Samohin and Lina Fedorova / Maxim Miroshkin were removed from the roster. No reasons were given. However, Samohin is not eligible to compete on the Senior Grand Prix circuit due to competing on the Junior Grand Prix this season. On August 21, Elladj Baldé and Vanessa Grenier / Maxime Deschamps were announced as their replacements.
 On September 14, Zhao Ziquan, Zheng Lu, and Cong Yue / Sun Zhuoming were added as host picks.
 On October 6, Madeline Aaron / Max Settlage were removed from the roster. No reason has been given. Their replacement was announced as Mari Vartmann / Ruben Blommaert.
 On October 15, Takahiko Kozuka was removed from the roster due to an injury. On October 16, his replacement was announced as Ivan Righini.
 On November 5, China's Cong / Sun withdrew from the ice dancing event due to a medical reason.

Results

Men

Ladies

Pairs

Ice dancing

References

External links
 2015 Cup of China at the International Skating Union
 Starting orders and result details

2015 in Chinese sport
2015 in figure skating
Cup of China
Sports competitions in Beijing
2010s in Beijing